The Los Angeles Fire Department (LAFD or LA City Fire) provides firefighting and emergency medical services to the city of Los Angeles, California, United States. The LAFD is responsible for approximately 4 million people who live in the agency's  jurisdiction. The Los Angeles Fire Department was founded in 1886 and is the third largest municipal fire department in the United States, after the New York City Fire Department and the Chicago Fire Department. The department may be unofficially referred to as the Los Angeles City Fire Department or "LA City Fire" to distinguish it from the Los Angeles County Fire Department which serves the county and whose name may directly confuse people, as the county seat is the city. Another possible reason is that the city and the unincorporated county are often bordering each other and thus the two appear to be serving the same area. The department is currently under the command of chief Kristin Crowley.

History

The Los Angeles Fire Department has it origins in the year 1871. In September of that year, George M. Fall, the County Clerk for Los Angeles County organized Engine Company No. 1. It was a volunteer firefighting force with an Amoskeag fire engine and a hose jumper (cart). The equipment was hand-drawn to fires. In the spring of 1874, the fire company asked the Los Angeles City Council to purchase horses to pull the engine. The Council refused and the fire company disbanded.

Many of the former members of Engine Company No. 1 reorganized under the name of Thirty-Eights No. 1 in May 1875, Engine Co. No. 2 was organized under the name Confidence Engine Company.

Los Angeles acquired its first "hook and ladder" truck for the Thirty-Eights. It proved to be too cumbersome and was ill-adapted to the needs of the city. It was sold to the city of Wilmington. In 1876, another "hook and ladder" truck was purchased, serving in the city until 1881.

In 1878, a third fire company was formed by the residents in the neighborhood of Sixth Street and Park. It was given the name of "Park Hose Co. No. 1".  East Los Angeles formed a hose company named "East Los Angeles Hose Co. No. 2" five years later. The final volunteer company was formed in the fall of 1883 in the Morris Vineyard area. This company was called "Morris Vineyard Hose Co. No.3."

All of these companies remained in service until February 1, 1886, when the present paid fire department came into existence.

In 1877, the first horses were bought for the city fire department. The department would continue to use horses for its equipment for almost fifty years, phasing out the last horse drawn equipment on July 19, 1921.

By 1900, the department had grown to 18 fire stations with 123 full-time paid firefighters and 80 fire horses.  The city had also installed 194 fire-alarm boxes allowing civilians to sound the alarm if a fire was spotted. 660 fire hydrants were placed throughout the city, giving firefighters access to a reliable water source. In 1955 Station 78 in Studio City became the first racially integrated station in the department.

Since 1978 the LAFD has provided emergency medical and fire suppression services to the city of San Fernando by contract .

In responses to the 2020 pandemic, the LAFD has helped to administrate the COVID-19 vaccine to residents from Los Angeles. Also, more than 1,800 Los Angeles firefighters have received the COVID-19 vaccine.

In 2022, Kristin Crowley became the first female, and the first openly gay, chief of the LAFD.

Organization

Administration
The official office for the Fire Chief of the department. CAD designation of 'FC1' and radio designation of 'Fire Chief'. The Fire Chief reports directly to the Board of Fire Commissioners.

Executive Bureau / Chief of Staff
Commanded by a Deputy Chief (Bureau Commander) who holds the title of Chief of Staff. Assisted by an Executive Administrative Assistant II and Senior Management Analyst I. In 2022, the Executive Bureau was changed from the previous name of Administration Bureau.

Planning Section
Commanded by a Battalion Chief (Section Commander), who maintains regular business hours (Monday-Friday). Also consists of four Captains and one Secretary.

Employee Relations Division
Commanded by a Battalion Chief (Division Commander), who maintains regular business hours (Monday-Friday). Assisted by a Secretary.

Community Liaison Office
Commanded by a civilian Public Information Director, who holds the assignment of Community Liaison Officer. Maintains regular business hours (Monday-Friday).

Community Service Unit
Commanded by a Captain I (Unit Commander), who holds the assignment of Department Public Information Officer. Maintains regular business hours (Monday-Friday).

The Community Service Unit also consists of three Public Service Officers (PSOs) who hold the department rank of Firefighter/Specialist. Maintains 24-hour platoon duty.

Community Risk Reduction Unit
Commanded by a Captain I (Unit Commander). Two Fire Inspector Is are also assigned to the CRRU.

FireStat LA Section
Commanded by a Battalion Chief (Section Commander) and the Fire Statistical Manager. Also consists of two Senior Fire Statistical Analyst.

Responsible for Departmental statistics, such as the City wide response metrics.

Professional Standards Division
Commanded by an Assistant Chief (Division Commander), civilian Chief Special Investigator and Battalion Chief.

Internal Investigations Unit
Consists of civilian Fire Special Investigators and Captains who serve as Department Advocates.

Administrative Operations
Commanded by a Chief Deputy, who has a CAD designation of 'CM1' and radio designation of 'Command 1'. Assisted by an Executive Administrative Assistant II, Administrative Clerk and a Battalion Chief who has the title of 'Executive Officer, Administrative Operations'.

Risk Management Section
All taken from RISK MANAGEMENT SECTION OVERVIEW Board of Fire Commissioners Report.
Commanded by a Battalion Chief (Section Commander) who has the title 'Department Health and Safety Officer'. Assisted by one Captain II (Chief Litigation Officer / On-Call Incident Safety Officer), one Captain I (Department Safety Coordinator / On-Call Incident Safety Officer) and a Secretary.

The primary objective of the Risk Management Section is to augment the line functions of the department by administering the department's In-Service Training Section, the Recruit Training Section, and the Quality Improvement Section. Specialized personnel assigned to Risk Management include the Department Safety Officer. The majority of personnel assigned to the Section maintain regular business hours.

Records Unit
Commanded by a Captain I (Unit Supervisor) who is also an Incident Safety Officer. Also consists of two Senior Administrative Clerks and one Administrative Clerk.

Injury Prevention Unit
Commanded by a Captain I (Unit Supervisor) who is also an Incident Safety Officer. Also consists of a Certified Athletic Trainer.

Medical Liaison Unit
Commanded by a Captain II (Unit Supervisor). Assisted by four Captain Is (assuming one for each Bureau?) and one Administrative Clerk.

Administrative Services Bureau
Commanded by the Fire Administrator (Bureau Commander), who has a CAD designation of 'FA1' and a radio designation of 'Fire Administrator'. Assisted by a Secretary.

The primary objective of this Bureau is the implementation of administrative staff functions in accordance with current policies and procedures as established by the Fire Chief.

Financial Services Division
Commanded by a Chief Management Analyst (Division Commander).

Budget Management Section
Commanded by a Senior Management Analyst II (Section Commander).

Budget Preparation/Control
Consists of three Senior Management Analyst Is, one Management Analyst and one Management Assistant.

Revenue Management Section
Commanded by a Senior Management Analyst II (Section Commander). Also consists of two Senior Management Analyst Is, one Management Analyst and one Management Assistant.

EMS Records Section
Commanded by a Senior Management Analyst II (Section Commander).

EMS Records Unit
Commanded by a Senior Management Analyst I (Unit Commander). Also consists of one Senior Administrative Clerk, four Administrative Clerks and one Management Assistant.

Contracts Unit
Commanded by a Senior Management Analyst I (Unit Commander). Also consists of one Management Analyst.

Fiscal Systems and Audit Section
Commanded by a Fiscal Systems Specialist II (Section Commander). Also consists of one Fiscal Systems Specialist I, one Senior Auditor, one Auditor I and one Accounting Clerk.

Accounting Services Section
Commanded by a Departmental Chief Accountant III (Section Commander).

Human Resources Division
Commanded by a Personnel Director II (Division Commander).

Selection and Records
Commanded by a Senior Personnel Analyst II.

Personnel Services Section
Commanded by a Senior Personnel Analyst I (Section Commander).

Selection Unit
Consists of three Personnel Analysts and one Senior Administrative Clerk.
Civilian & Sworn selection, Bilingual, Advanced Vacant Step Hiring (Civilian), Advanced Starting Salary Falls & Education Bonus (Sworn)

Records Unit
Consists of one Senior Personnel Analyst I, one Personnel Records Supervisor, one Personnel Analyst, two Senior Administrative Clerks and one Office Services Assistant.

Fire Prevention & Public Safety Bureau
Commanded by a Deputy Chief (Bureau Commander), who also holds the title of Fire Marshal. Has a CAD designation of 'CM5' and a radio designation of 'Command 5'. Assistant commanded by a Deputy Chief (Assistant Bureau Commander), who also holds the title of Assistant Fire Marshal. Also consists of a Secretary and Management Analyst.

Administrative Section
Commanded by a Battalion Chief (Section Commander). Assisted by an Office Services Assistant.

Legal Unit
Commanded by a Captain II. Assisted by a Senior Administrative Clerk.

Planning Unit
Commanded by a Captain I.

Research Unit
Consists of three Fire Inspectors.

Industrial & Commercial Section
Commanded by a Battalion Chief (Section Commander). Assisted by an Administrative Clerk.

Central Industrial Unit
Commanded by a Captain I. Assisted by an Administrative Clerk.

Harbor Industrial Unit
Commanded by a Captain I.

High-Rise Unit
Commanded by a Captain I.

Valley Industrial Unit
Commanded by a Captain I.

West Industrial Unit
Commanded by a Captain I.

Cannabis Unit
Commanded by a Captain I.

Brush Clearance Unit
Commanded by a Captain I.

Public Safety Section
Commanded by a Battalion Chief (Section Commander). Assisted by a Senior Administrative Clerk.

Public Assemblage Unit
Commanded by a Captain I.

Film Unit
Commanded by a Captain I. Assisted by a Senior Administrative Clerk.

Schools & Churches & Institutions Unit
Commanded by a Captain I. Assisted by an Administrative Clerk.

Valley Public Safety Unit
Commanded by a Captain II.

CUPA Section
Commanded by the Certified Unified Program Agency (CUPA) Manager.

Environmental Unit - Underground Storage Tank & HazMat
Commanded by a Captain II.

Technical Support Unit
Commanded by a Supervising Hazmat Specialist. Also consists of a Hazmat Specialist, Fire Inspector II, Industrial Hygienist, Engineering Geologist Associate IV and Environmental Technician.

Plan Check Unit
Consists of two Risk Management Plan Specialists and one Fire Inspector II.

Data Management Unit
Commanded by a Principal Clerk. Assisted by two Accounting Clerks.

Fire Development Services Section
Commanded by a Senior Fire Protection Engineer. Assisted by one Office Services Assistant, one Management Analyst and one Accounting Clerk.

Fire Life Safety Plan Check Unit
Consists of one Fire Protection Engineer.

Fire Life Safety Field Inspection Unit
Commanded by one Captain II. Assisted by one Administrative Clerk.

Municipal Services Unit
Commanded by a Captain I. Assisted by one Administrative Clerk.

Hydrants and Access Unit
Commanded by a Captain I.

Information Technology Bureau
Commanded by the Chief Information Officer.

Infrastructure and Operations Division

Infrastructure and Help Desk Support Section
Commanded by a Senior Systems Analyst II. Also consists of two Systems Programmer IIs and two System Analyst Is.

Helpdesk and Technical Support
Commanded by a Senior Systems Analyst II. Also consists if three Systems Analyst IIs and two Administrative Clerks.

Software Applications Support Section
Consists of two Senior Systems Analyst IIs, one Programmer Analyst V, one Programmer Analyst IV, one Programmer Analyst III and one Systems Analyst II.

GIS Unit
Commanded by a Senior Systems Analyst I. Also consists of two GIS Supervisor Is and four GIS Specialists.

Enterprise Records Section
Commanded by a Senior Systems Analyst II. Also consists of three Programmer Analyst IIIs.

Network Staffing Support Section
Commanded by a Senior Systems Analyst II.

Development Operations Division
Commanded an Information System Manager II.

Fire Communications Dispatch Support Section (FCDSS)
Commanded by a Battalion Chief and assisted by one Senior Management Analyst I and one Secretary.

Technical Control
Commanded by a Communications Electrician Supervisor.

Fire Communications Unit
Commanded by a Captain I. Also consists of one Communications Electrician.

Telephone Coordinator
Firefighter III

Fire Communications Technician Support Unit
Commanded by a Captain I. Also consists of one Senior Communications Electrician.
* Organization structure obtained via LAFD Administrative Roster September 2022.

Rank Structure

Types of apparatus
The department utilizes a wide array of apparatus and equipment. These are most but not all of the apparatus.

Triple combination engines
The triple combination fire engine or “triple” (as it is commonly called) is the most common type of firefighting apparatus in Los Angeles. The term “triple combination” refers to the apparatus having three components; water tank, high capacity water pump, and hose. The triple can be found as a one-piece engine company or as two engines assigned to a Task Force station. The “triples” used by the LAFD have a direct drive, dual centrifuge main pump rated at 1,500 GPM at 150 psi with a 10-foot lift through a 6-inch suction. These apparatus carry a combination of  all of the following sizes of hose; 4″, 2″, 1 3/4″, 1 1/2″ and 1″. The standard hose load is 750' of 4", 750' of 2 1/2" with a 325GPM nozzle, 400' of 1 3/4" with a 200 GPM nozzle, 400' of 1 1/2" with a 125 GPM nozzle and 500' of 1" with a dual gallonage 10/40 GPM nozzle. The water tank carrying capacity of all LAFD engines is 500 gallons. All frontline engines are equipped with a 30-gallon Class A foam injection system with the exception of Engine 51 at LAX that carries Class B foam in the onboard system. These apparatus are staffed by four members, including a captain who is the company commander, an engineer responsible for driving, maintaining and operating the pump, and two firefighters. A number of triples in the LAFD are also paramedic assessment companies – meaning they include a firefighter/paramedic as part of the crew. All engines are equipped with fire suppression gear as well as basic rescue equipment and emergency medical services equipment.

Light Forces and Task Forces

The LAFD uses the concept of Light Forces and Task Forces which can be considered one "Resource", although comprising more than one unit or company.

A Light Force is composed of a Pump Engine (200 Series, for example Engine 201 or Engine 301 for 100 stations) and a Ladder Truck. Light forces will almost always respond together as one unit or resource.

A Task Force is simply a Light Force coupled with an Engine. An Engine Company is considered a single unit or "resource" when responding to incidents on its own. A Task Force usually responds to larger incidents, such as structural fires, and is made up of an Engine, a 200 Series Engine (Pump), and a Truck, all operating together. While a standard Engine is always staffed with a full crew, a 200 Series Engine (Pump)is only staffed by a driver (and one other firefighter if responding as part of a Light Force). The purpose of the 200 Series Engine (Pump) is to provide support and equipment to the Truck in a Light Force, and either the Truck Company or the Engine Company in a Task Force.

Rescue Ambulances

Rescue Ambulances (RAs), often called 'rescues' for short, can be considered either advanced life support (ALS), or basic life support (BLS) units. Ambulances number 1-112 are frontline ALS staffed by 2 firefighter / paramedics, while those in the 200 series are ALS reserves. Ambulances in the 800s & 900s are BLS staffed by 2 firefighter EMTs, with 900-series units assigned to Stations identified numerically over 100.

Helicopters

The Air Operations Section of the LAFD operates out of Fire Station 114 at Van Nuys Airport. The station houses six helicopters available for both aerial firefighting and air medical services.FIRE 1, FIRE 2, FIRE 3, FIRE 4, and FIRE 5 are all AgustaWestland AW139s. The final helicopter, FIRE 6, is a Bell 206B.
The department previously operated Bell 205 and Bell 412 types, the last of which were retired by 2017 to make way for the newer AW139s.

Fireboats

The Port of Los Angeles is under the jurisdiction of the LAFD which operates 5 fireboats to provide fire protection for ships and dockside structures. They are equipped with a  pump and a  deluge gun. They also have a  firefighting foam capacity.

Fireboat 4, also known as the Bethel F. Gifford, was commissioned in 1962 and is the oldest of the fleet. It is equipped with jet-stream nozzles to allow for increased maneuverability.

Boat 2 also has an onboard area for treatment and care of rescued persons.

USAR Task Force 1

The Los Angeles Fire Department is the founding member of one of California's eight FEMA Urban Search and Rescue Task Forces. California Task Force 1 (CA-TF1) is available to respond to natural or man-made disasters around the country and world and assist with search and rescue, medical support, damage assessment and communications.

Stations and apparatus 

The LAFD is divided into four operational Bureaus: Operations Central Bureau (OCB), Operations West Bureau (OWB), Operations South Bureau (OSB); formerly known as 'South Division', and Operations Valley Bureau (OVB); formerly known as 'North Division'. Each Bureau is commanded by a Deputy Chief, who holds the title of 'Bureau Commander'. Each Bureau also has an Assistant Chief serves as the 'Assistant Bureau Commander'. To replicate the former North and South Division, OCB and OVB also have three additional Assistant Chiefs who work 24-hour platoon duty. These Assistant Chiefs staff marked Dodge RAM SUVs and respond to major incidents - Command 22 for OCB and Command 42 of OVB.

 Operations Central Bureau compromises of 3 battalions and 22 Fire Stations. Battalion 1 (8 Fire Stations), Battalion 2 (8 Fire Stations) and Battalion 11 (6 Fire Stations). OCB's headquarters is at Fire Station 3.
 Operations West Bureau compromises of 3 battalions and 21 Fire Stations. Battalion 4 (7 Fire Stations), Battalion 5 (7 Fire Stations) and Battalion 9 (7 Fire Stations). OWB's headquarters is at Fire Station 82.
 Operations South Bureau compromises 3 battalions and 25 Fire Stations. Battalion 6 (11 Fire Stations), Battalion 13 (8 Fire Stations), Battalion 18 (6 Fire Stations). OSB's headquarters is at the San Pedro Municipal Building (638 South Beacon Street, Suite 374).
 Operations Valley Bureau compromises of 4 battalions and 31 Fire Stations. Battalion 10 (9 Fire Stations), Battalion 12 (7 Fire Stations), Battalion 14 (7 Fire Stations) and Battalion 15 (8 Fire Stations). OVB's headquarters is temporarily stationed at Fire Station 83.

Each of the four operational Bureaus house a number of battalions. These battalions are staffed by uniformed personnel who rotate on a 24-hour platoon duty. Each battalion is commanded by a Battalion Chief, who responds to major incidents within their battalion, usually 20-30 square miles in size. They have the responsibility of commanding these scenes as the Incident Commander (IC). Battalion Chiefs typically respond to these incidents with a Firefighter/Specialist, who holds the title of Emergency Incident Technician (EIT). EITs drive the Dodge RAM SUV to the scenes and act as an assistant to the Battalion Chief.

Note that stations with both a truck and a 200 series engine (pump) will usually respond the two apparatus together as a lightforce. So, for example, Truck 1 and Engine 201 will often respond together as Light Force 1.  The only full time exception is Fire Station 9 where Engine 209 is fully staffed. Truck 9 responds as a single company when appropriate.  During "Augmented Staffing" (red-flag brush fire weather, or other increased threat days) the 200 series engines can be fully staffed as a 4-member Engine Company. Each company can then either be dispatched individually or as a "Task Force".

400 series Engines are ready reserve apparatus. These apparatus are full loaded with equipment and hose. They are used either for short term relief IE when a frontline apparatus is shut down for repair or maintenance. 400 series Engines are also staffed as needed during "High Hazard" days or other augmented staffing times.

The LAFD has six Type 3 wildland Engines. Five are property of the State of California OES but are staffed as needed and maintained by the LAFD.  Together these 5 Engines form Strike Team 1880C. Engine 482C is housed at Fire Station 82 and is a ready reserve Type 3 wildland Engine.

Command Assignment List

CAD Designation List

Station List

In pop culture
The LAFD has been featured in many TV shows and movies. Sometimes the LAFD or LAFD equipment is just seen in the background.

 (1974) Firehouse, starring James Drury
 (1981–1982) Code Red, starring Lorne Greene
 (1995-2000) LAPD: Life On The Beat, the fire department was featured often responding to various emergency calls with the "LAPD".
 (1999) Rescue 77
 (2015) San Andreas
 (2018–present) 9-1-1

See also

 Fire Station No. 1
 Engine Company No. 28
 Engine House No. 18 (Los Angeles, California)
 Fire Station No. 14 (Los Angeles, California)
 Fire Station No. 23 (Los Angeles, California)
 Fire Station No. 30, Engine Company No. 30
 Los Angeles Fire Department Museum and Memorial
 Louis R. Nowell, fire captain who became a City Council member
 Ralph J. Scott, formerly known as Fireboat #2
 The Stentorians Fire Station No.46
 Frank Hotchkin Memorial Training Center Los Angeles

References

External links

 Map of all LAFD Fire Stations
 Los Angeles Fire Department Historical Archive
 Los Angeles Fire Department News & Information Web Log
 LAFD Recruiting

Ambulance services in the United States
Fire departments in California
Government agencies established in 1886
Fire Department
Fire
1886 establishments in California